"Is There Anybody Out There?" is a song from the eleventh Pink Floyd album, The Wall.

Music

The first half of the piece has the same concept of "Hey You", being a distress call from Pink. Musically, it's a droning bass synthesizer with various sound effects layered on top, and a repeating chorus of "Is there anybody out there?".  The shrill siren-like sound effect used during this song is also used in an earlier Pink Floyd work, "Echoes". The noise is mimicking a seagull cry.  The seagull noise was created by David Gilmour using a wah-wah pedal with the guitar and output leads plugged in the wrong way round.

The second half of the song is an instrumental classical guitar solo. In interviews, David Gilmour has said that he tried to perform it, and was not satisfied with the final result ("I could play it with a leather pick but couldn't play it properly fingerstyle"). Accordingly, session musician Joe DiBlasi was brought in by Michael Kamen to play with the rest of the orchestra. He was wrongly credited as "Ron DiBlasi" on the album sleeve and Pink Floyd website because Roger Waters only remembered that it was a three-letter name; Ron was the closest name he could remember to Joe when creating the record.

Plot
At this point in the plot, the bitter and alienated Pink is attempting to reach anybody outside of his self-built wall. The repeated question "Is there anybody out there?" suggests that no response is heard.

On the other hand, "Comfortably Numb" starts with the sentence "Hello, Is there anybody in there?", addressed to Pink.

Film version

In the film Pink Floyd – The Wall, during the ominous opening to the song, Pink is standing in front of the completed wall, and throws himself against it several times as if trying to escape. Then, during the acoustic guitar section, it cuts to Pink laying out all his possessions on the floor of the hotel room in neat piles. At the end of the song, it cuts to the bathroom where Pink shaves off his eyebrows and body hair, and tries to cut off his nipples with the razor, severing them.

TV excerpts
There are two excerpts from the TV programmes Gunsmoke and Gomer Pyle, U.S.M.C. overlaid in the background of the track.

The Gunsmoke excerpt is from the episode entitled "Fandango" (first aired: 11 February 1967); Dialog starts at 32:54 of the show; the dialogue is as follows:

The Gomer Pyle, U.S.M.C. excerpt is from the episode entitled "Gomer Says 'Hey' to the President" (first aired: 20 October 1967); Dialog starts at 1:45 of the show; the dialogue is as follows:

Personnel
David Gilmour – whale/seagull sound (electric guitar and wah-wah pedal), backing vocals
Roger Waters – lead vocals, bass guitar
Richard Wright – Prophet-5 synthesizer

with:

Bob Ezrin – synthesizer, string synth
Joe DiBlasi – classical guitar
Michael Kamen – orchestral arrangement

Personnel per Fitch and Mahon.

Versions
 An alternate version appears in the film Pink Floyd – The Wall
 The Oliver Hart song "Ode to the Wall", from The Many Faces of Oliver Hart, samples this song extensively.
 The Zac Brown Band song "Junkyard", from Jekyll + Hyde, samples the song extensively.

References

1979 songs
Pink Floyd songs
Songs written by Roger Waters
Song recordings produced by Bob Ezrin
Song recordings produced by David Gilmour
Song recordings produced by Roger Waters
Songs about loneliness